George Pace (1915–75) was an English architect who specialised in ecclesiastical work.  He was trained in London, during which time he won prizes for his designs. From 1941 to 1949 he served in the army, and was then appointed as surveyor to the diocese of Sheffield.  Similar appointments to other cathedrals followed.  Pace's works included restoring, repairing and making additions to existing churches, designing fittings and furniture for churches, and designing new churches.  His style was essentially Modernist, but he had respect for traditional styles, sometimes combining elements from both in his designs.

This list includes Pace's major works, ecclesiastical and non-ecclesiastical.  All his work on listed buildings is included in the list, but otherwise it is incomplete.

Key

New buildings

Additions, alterations and restorations

Fittings and furniture

References
Citations

Sources

Lists of buildings and structures by architect